Painted Canyon is a valley in Billings County, North Dakota, in the United States. 

Painted Canyon was so named on account of its colorful rocks.

Water-supply well
There is a 588-metre water-supply well located at the Painted Canyon Overlook, which has a specific capacity of about 0.4 gallon per minute per foot.They have beautiful trails that are approximately 2 miles long.

References

Landforms of Billings County, North Dakota
Valleys of North Dakota